19741 Callahan, provisional designation , is a stony background asteroid from the inner regions of the asteroid belt, approximately 3.5 kilometers in diameter.

It was discovered on 5 January 2000, by the Lincoln Near-Earth Asteroid Research, LINEAR, at the Lincoln Laboratory's Experimental Test Site, Socorro, New Mexico, and named after a mentor of the 2003 Discovery Channel Young Scientist Challenge.

Orbit and classification 

The S-type asteroid orbits the Sun in the inner main-belt at a distance of 2.0–2.5 AU once every 3 years and 4 months (1,231 days). Its orbit has an eccentricity of 0.13 and an inclination of 8° with respect to the ecliptic.

Physical characteristics 

In December 2009, a rotational lightcurve for this asteroid was obtained from photometric observations at the U.S. Palomar Transient Factory, California. It gave a rotation period of  hours with a relatively high brightness variation of 0.81 in magnitude, indicative of a non-spherical shape.

According to the survey carried out by the NEOWISE mission of NASA's Wide-field Infrared Survey Explorer, Callahan measures 3.9 kilometers in diameter and its surface has an albedo of 0.22. The Collaborative Asteroid Lightcurve Link assumes a standard albedo for stony asteroids of 0.20 and calculates a diameter of 3.1 kilometers, with an absolute magnitude of 14.89.

Naming 

This minor planet was named after Diane Callahan, teacher at U.S. Fairfield Middle School, Ohio, who mentored a finalist in the 2003 Discovery Channel Youth Science Challenge (DCYSC), a middle school science competition. The approved naming citation was published by the Minor Planet Center on 10 October 2003.

References

External links 
 Asteroid Lightcurve Database (LCDB), query form (info )
 Dictionary of Minor Planet Names, Google books
 Asteroids and comets rotation curves, CdR – Observatoire de Genève, Raoul Behrend
 Discovery Circumstances: Numbered Minor Planets (15001)-(20000) – Minor Planet Center
 
 

019741
019741
Named minor planets
20000105